Grey oat usually refers to Avena strigosa, more often called the black oat. 

Grey oat less often refers to Avena sativa, more often called the common oat or white oat.

See also
 Avena, the genus of oats